The House of Schaumburg was a dynasty of German rulers. Until c. 1485, it was also known as the House of Schauenburg. Together with its ancestral possession, the County of Schaumburg, the family also ruled the County of Holstein and its partitions Holstein-Itzehoe, Holstein-Kiel, Holstein-Pinneberg (till 1640), Holstein-Plön, Holstein-Segeberg and Holstein-Rendsburg (till 1460) and through the latter at times also the Duchy of Schleswig.

History
 The Schaumburgs were named after Schauenburg Castle, near Rinteln on the Weser, where the owners started calling themselves Lords (from 1295 Counts) of Schauenburg. Adolf I probably became the first Lord of Schauenburg in 1106.

In 1110, Adolf I, Lord of Schauenburg was appointed by Lothair, Duke of Saxony to hold Holstein and Stormarn, including Hamburg, as fiefs.

Holstein was occupied by Denmark after the Battle of Stellau (1201), but was reconquered by the Count of Schauenburg and his allies in the Battle of Bornhöved (1227).

After the death in 1640 of Count Otto V without children, the House of Schaumburg became extinct. The County of Holstein-Pinneberg was merged with the Duchy of Holstein. The County of Schaumburg proper was partitioned among the Schaumburg heirs into three parts, one incorporated into the ducal Brunswick and Lunenburgian Principality of Lüneburg, the second becoming the County of Schaumburg-Lippe and the third continuing the name County of Schaumburg, ruled in personal union by Hesse-Cassel.

List of states ruled by the House of Schaumburg

 County of Schaumburg: c. 1106–1640 (with Holstein, then with Holstein-Itzehoe and then with Holstein-Pinneberg)
 County of Holstein with Schaumburg: 1110-1137; 1142-1203; 1227-1261
 County of Holstein-Kiel: 1261–1390
 County of Holstein-Itzehoe with Schaumburg: 1261–1290
 County of Holstein-Segeberg: 1273–1315, and again 1397–1403 
 County of Holstein-Pinneberg with Schaumburg: 1290–1640
 County of Holstein-Rendsburg: 1290–1459
 Duchy of Schleswig: 1326-1330; 1375-1459

See also

Counts of Schauenburg and Holstein

References

House of Schauenburg